This is a list of fictional creatures, and aliens from the universe of the long-running BBC science fiction television series Doctor Who, including Torchwood, The Sarah Jane Adventures, K-9 and K-9 and Company. It covers alien races, and other fictional creatures, but not specific characters. Individual characters are listed in separate articles.

Note that some information on the page is taken from spin-off media.

Q

Queen Bat

Quill 

The Quill was a humanoid species from the planet Rhodia who had a long history of war with the Rhodians. All the Rhodians and the Quill were killed by the Shadow Kin, except the Prince of Rhodia and Andra'ath, the Quill freedom fighter who was indentured to him via an Arn in her brain. The two were rescued by the Twelfth Doctor and brought to Coal Hill Academy, where the prince took on the name "Charlie Smith", and Andra'ath the name "Miss Quill". On Earth, Miss Quill was able to remove the Arn in her brain with the aid of Ballon.

R

Raak 
The Raak was a sea monster experimented on by Crozier in Mindwarp. It was a mutated fish created to monitor tidal wave technology. The part was played by Robert West under his original equity name of Russell West.

Racnoss

The Racnoss appeared in 2006 Christmas special, "The Runaway Bride".

The Racnoss are described by the Tenth Doctor as an ancient race of aliens from the Dark Times of the universe. Half-humanoid, half-arachnid in appearance, they were an invasion force who consumed everything on the planets they conquered. Their race was wiped out by the Fledgling Empires, over 4.6 billion years ago. Although the Time Lords are not specified as being a part of the Empires, the Doctor acknowledges that his people unravelled their power source, Huon particles, and upon hearing the name of the Doctor's planet, Gallifrey, the Empress claims that they "murdered" the Racnoss. The Doctor and Donna Noble are shown witnessing nearly all of the survivors of the race escape in their ship to where the Earth would later form, serving in place of a planetesimal as its core, hibernating for billions of years, with the exception of their Empress. The Doctor notes that because the Huon particles ceased to exist, the surviving Racnoss are stuck in hibernation. The Empress is seen coming to Earth in her ship, the Webstar in this episode, seeking to use the Huon particles which had been recreated by the Torchwood Institute using the water of the River Thames as a means of reviving her "children" before feasting on the human population of Earth. The last Racnoss are presumed wiped out when the Doctor drains the waters of the Thames down the shaft leading to their ship; the Empress is killed when her own ship is destroyed by the British Army at the order of "Mr Saxon".

The Empress appears briefly in a flashback in "Turn Left" (2008). In the parallel universe created by Donna, she has still been defeated, but the Doctor, without Donna to stop him and ultimately save his life, is shown having drowned; a UNIT soldier speculates that he died "too fast for him to regenerate"; without his protection, the Earth is shown becoming a dystopia over the next few years.

The Racnoss also appear in the Doctor Who: Classic Doctors, New Monsters audio Empire of the Racnoss, which sees the Fifth Doctor being drawn into the war against the Racnoss in the distant past when a call for help during the war is picked up by a long-dormant program in the TARDIS, resulting in the Doctor being caught up in a political struggle between the Empress of the Racnoss and her traitorous old consort and her replacement consort.

Rakweed 

An alien plant from the planet Raxacoricofallapatorius, the Rakweed plant was presented to Sarah Jane Smith as a gift from the Blathereen family. However, the Rakweed quickly began releasing deadly spores into the atmosphere, which left its victims with an abnormal rash on their skin and in a coma. It later became apparent that the Blathereen were addicted to eating the Rakweed, which was highly sensitive to loud noises, and so when Mr Smith sounded a loud alarm across Ealing, the Rakweed shrivelled up and died, and ultimately meant that Blathereen exploded over Sarah Jane and her companions.

Raxacoricofallapatorian 

Native to Raxacoricofallapatorius, Raxacoricofallapatorians are grouped by extended family names which are sometimes used to refer to their species generically. They hatch from eggs and are composed of living calcium. Capital punishment is practiced on the homeworld, which involves immersion of convicted criminals in acid that slowly dissolves them while still alive, which spectators then drink as a soup.

The Slitheen family are a ruthless criminal sect motivated by profit. Convicted for their crimes on Raxacoricofallapatorius, they have been exiled from their homeworld and face execution if they return.

The Blathereen family are sworn enemies of the Slitheen, and have infiltrated the prison on the planet Justicia.

A Raxacoricofallapatorian appears in an alien bar in "The End of Time".

Reaper 

Reapers appeared in the Ninth Doctor episode "Father's Day", written by Paul Cornell. Although not named on screen, they were referred to as "Reapers" in the publicity material for the episode. The production team based their design on the Grim Reaper, with their tails shaped like scythes.

Reapers are multi-limbed, flying creatures similar to pterosaurs, with a large wingspan, sharp teeth both in the form of a beak and a secondary mouth in their torsos, coupled with a rapacious attitude. The Reapers are apparently extradimensional, materialising and dematerialising out of the spacetime vortex. They are attracted to temporal paradoxes that damage time, like bacteria swarming around a wound. They then proceed to "sterilise" the wound by consuming everyone in sight. The older the thing they devour the more it satisfies them.

Once in this dimension, however, they can be blocked by material barriers. The older the barriers, the more effective they are, but even the oldest of barriers cannot stop them forever. Paradoxes can also allow them to directly materialise at the spot of the paradox. If the timeline is restored, they vanish, with their actions reversed as if they had never happened.

In "Father's Day", the Doctor explained that when the Time Lords were still around, there were laws to prevent the spread of paradoxes and that such paradoxes could be repaired. This implies that the Reapers are a natural phenomenon whose manifestation could be prevented if the paradox was resolved quickly. However, with the elimination of the other Time Lords in the Last Great Time War, there was no longer any agency that could repair time.

Refusian

Rhodian 

The Rhodians were a humanoid species that ruled the planet Rhodia and had a long history of war with the Quill. All the Rhodians and the Quill were killed by the Shadow Kin, except the Prince of Rhodia and the Quill freedom fighter who was indentured to him. The two were rescued by the Twelfth Doctor and brought to Coal Hill Academy, where the prince took on the name "Charlie Smith" and Andra'ath the name "Miss Quill". Charlie managed to bring the Cabinet of Souls with him to Earth, a device that contained the souls of all the fallen Rhodians, which he later used to wipe out all the Shadow Kin when they invaded Earth.

Ribosian

Rill

Robots 

Dum Robots, Voc Robots & Super Voc Robot

These robots oversee the menial work on sand-crawling miner vehicles that are used to gather valuable minerals. The robots are divided into three classes:
 Black-coloured "Dum" robots that cannot speak.
 Gold-green-coloured "Voc" robots that can interact with the human crew.
 A silver-coloured "Super Voc" robot, SV7, who manages the other robots.

Rutan 

An alien species in an endless war with the Sontarans, the Rutans appear as jellyfish-like glowing green spheres. Like the Zygons, Rutans can shapeshift at will. They are also vulnerable to certain sound frequencies.

S

Salakans 
Mentioned in Wally K. Daly's Doctor Who The Ultimate Evil story, a salesman named Dwarf Mordant was from a race known as the Salakans.

Sand Beast

Saturnyn 

Saturnyn are vampiric, lobster-like aliens that battled the Eleventh Doctor in 16th-century Venice in "The Vampires of Venice" (2010). Their appearance is quite obviously fear-inducing due to many sharp protrusions and fangs. They were able to breathe underwater and had vampire-like qualities such as a vulnerability to sunlight, no reflections and a thirst for human blood. However, these are easily explainable; as "fish from space", they are used to living in the dark depths; anyone's mind cannot deal with conflicting information of a perception filter and a Saturnyn's true reflection; Rosanna and Francesco drank the blood of the girls attending the school so they could replace it with their own. Their leader, Signora Rosanna Calvierri used a perception filter to appear as a human woman, who started a school for girls; it was a guise for seeking victims to be transformed into mates for Francesco's brothers. They planned to flood Venice in an attempt to continue their civilization since their own planet Saturnyne was destroyed by cracks in the universe. When the Doctor foiled their plan, Rosanna committed suicide by allowing her brood to devour her. However, when the Doctor rewrote time in "The Big Bang" (2010) by preventing the cracks' existence, it is highly likely Saturnyne was not destroyed by the cracks and the Calvierri family did not end.

The Doctor, at least in his eleventh incarnation, considered his adventure battling the Saturnyns to be memorable. In "A Good Man Goes to War" (2011), he said his adventures were "running about, sexy, fish vampires, and blowing up stuff", and even asked Melody Pond if Amy told her about the "Vampires in Venice" during "Let's Kill Hitler" (2011).

Savage

Scarecrow 

Straw-filled foot soldiers created by Son of Mine, using molecular fringe animation. They were relentless and untiring, with rudimentary intelligence. Even after being cut down by machine-gun fire, they could be reanimated. In a perfect sense of irony, Son of Mine was frozen in time and dressed up as a scarecrow, to watch over England's fields.

Another type of scarecrow which came alive were set to appear in the unmade movie Doctor Who Meets Scratchman, which was later novelised by Tom Baker.

Screamer

Sea Devil 

Sea Devils were turtle-like humanoids that lived in Earth's oceans millions of years before humans evolved. They believed that a small planet would crash into Earth, which instead became Earth's moon. Like the Silurians, they went into hibernation and wanted to take the planet back from humans when they awoke.

Seed Pod

Sensorite

Sex Gas

An unnamed gaseous alien parasite that comes to Earth to feed on orgasmic energy in "Day One" (2006), claiming that there's no other energy in the universe like it; it's possible that orgasmic energy is like a drug to the gas, and that it's addicted. Composed of vorax and ceranium gases, Earth's atmosphere is poisonous to the alien, so it needs to take a human host to survive for prolonged periods; it doesn't show up on cameras. It vies for control with its host, causing physiological changes that will eventually cause the host's internal organs to explode.

The alien also makes its host secrete a blend of ultra-powerful pheromones that cause tremendous sexual attraction in those around it for the purposes of feeding; those with stronger wills might be able to resist the pheromones. Coupling with the host is fatal, causing the host's partner to disintegrate into a pile of dust at climax and allowing the alien to absorb the energy from the orgasm. It appeared to know human biology well (or at least just enough), knowing it needed the opposite gender in order to get the energy. It was tricked out of its host and left in a portable energy prison until it expired from being poisoned by the earth's air.

The BBC Torchwood website lists it as the "Sex gas". Producer Russell T Davies, in the documentary series Torchwood Declassified, refers to it as a "sex monster".

This creature served as a way of showing that Torchwood's stories could go places that Doctor Who's children-friendly stories could not.

The Shadow 

A member of an unknown race who served the Black Guardian. His face was blank, except for the vague impressions of the shape of a skull; he wore what seemed like dark ceremonial robes.

Shadow Kin 

The Shadow Kin were a race of fire-type humanoids from the Underneath. The Shadow Kin could exist as pure shadow and in a solid form, but could only survive physically with the presence of a shadow. They were ruled by the Shadow King, who ruled from the Shadow Palace on the Underneath. The Shadow Kin arrived on Rhodia in the midst of a civil war and killed all the Rhodians and Quills save the Rhodian prince Charlie Smith and his Quill protector Miss Quill, who were rescued by the Twelfth Doctor and brought to Coal Hill Academy. Following them to Earth, the Shadow Kin, led by Corakinus, emerged through a tear in space-time at the school's prom night but were forced back by the Doctor. During the invasion, when Coal Hill student April MacLean fired a displacement gun at Corakinus and Charlie pushed her out of the way, she and Corakinus began sharing April's heart. April found her way to the Shadow Palace and defeated Corakinus in battle. She became the new king, and had the Shadow Kin lock up Corakinus. However, they later returned to invade Earth again under Corakinus' command. Charlie decided to use a displacement gun to kill April and Corakinus, thus allowing Charlie to become the new Shadow King. As King, he ordered his army to retreat, and then he used the Cabinet of Souls to wipe all the Shadow Kin out of existence. After he used the cabinet, April resurrected but in Corakinus' body.

Shakri 

The Shakri are a species spoken of in Gallifreyan myths, said to be the "pest controllers of the universe"; Amy Pond found it a "strange choice for a bed-time story". They attack any species that they believe will pose a threat to the universe, hence why they tried eliminating humanity in the 21st century, years before they could colonise space in the future. A hologram of a wrinkled humanoid in a black robe was seen on the Shakri ship; however, it is not known if this is actually what the Shakri look like. The Shakri consider seven an important number, given they used that amount of portals, ships, cube activation time, and for a countdown. They follow something known as "the Tally"; the Doctor has implied that the Shakri compare a species' failures and successes to decide whether or not they will be subjected to "pest control".

Shalka 

The Shalka appear to be a serpentine alien race made of living rock and magma, but they are actually bioplasmic entities, living plasma, their physical appearance merely a "crust" concealing their true forms. They breathe volcanic air and prefer high temperatures, being most comfortable underground where lava meets metamorphic rock. They communicate through high-pitched screaming, which they can use for a variety of effects, like tunnelling through rock or mentally controlling other life forms. They also use sound as a part of their technology.

In an alternate timeline, the Shalka arrived on Earth via meteorite, initially landing near Mount Ruapehu, New Zealand, subsequently establishing a beachhead for their planned invasion of Earth beneath the Lancashire town of Lannet. They also created a stable wormhole for landing their invasion force, which could also be converted into a black hole to dispose of their enemies, as they tried to do with the Doctor.

As they claimed to have done to billions of planets before, they intended to implant Shalka larvae into key segments of the population, mind controlling them into emitting a scream that would destroy the ozone layer. In this way, the Shalka intended to raise the surface temperature of the planet to the point where the human race would perish but the Shalka could thrive. The Shalka would then live beneath the surface, with the rest of the universe believing that Earth's inhabitants had died of self-inflicted ecological damage. The Doctor defeated their plans with the help of the British military and a Lannet barmaid named Alison.
They are not technically Doctor Who monsters since they appeared in a failed attempt to restart the series before it was permanently revived.

Shambonie 

An alien race said to have large foreheads.

Shansheeth 

The Shansheeth are a race of vulture-like aliens which appear in Death of the Doctor by Russell T Davies. The Claw Shansheeth of the Fifteenth Funeral Fleet announce to Sarah Jane Smith via UNIT the death of the Eleventh Doctor, and take charge of the funeral procession; Mr Smith confirms their status as the undertakers of the universe, finding fallen heroes on battlefields. However, the band of Shansheeth that Sarah Jane and Jo Jones (Katy Manning) encounter want to use the companions' memories of the Doctor, in conjunction with their Memory Weave device to create a TARDIS key with which they can steal the TARDIS and prevent death across the timeline. Sarah Jane and Jo, instead, overload the device, which blows up and destroys the Shansheeth along with their UNIT accomplice. The main branch of the Shansheeth later apologise to Sarah Jane for the actions of this rogue group.

Shrivenzale

"Simon" 
"Simon" was an alien mentioned on the Torchwood website, specifically in an article attached to, and especially in, Amanda Davies' diary. He was travelling on Earth, seeking to discover the source of life. He wandered into a countryside village and was taken in by the Davies family. Simon, having based his appearance on Jon Bon Jovi, near-instantly seduced the family's daughter – Amanda, and ultimately left her pregnant with an alien baby (which itself quickly developed, and began to degrade her health). Simon then disappeared around the same time as Jack Harkness arrived (implying he had been captured or killed by Torchwood), and later Jack met with Amanda's father and (apparently) made an agreement to have the entire village, including Amanda, subjected to amnesia pills, have all records and evidence that the Davies' existed in the village (including Amanda's diary) confiscated, have the alien baby removed before Amanda died, and then send the Davies family away with a new identity.

The Silence 

Self-proclaimed "Sentinels of History", the Silence are genetically engineered members of the Papal Mainframe under the Academy of the Question. As they were originally created as confessional priests, Silents cannot be remembered unless they are being looked at, or if someone is wearing an eyedrive. In "The Time of the Doctor" (2013), with The Doctor's enemies converging on Trenzalore, the Papal Mainframe underwent a faith conversion into the Church of the Silence whose main belief is that "Silence will fall" to keep the Doctor from answering the oldest question in the universe "Doctor Who?" to avert a war caused by the Time Lords' return. However, a group of Silents under a splinter chapel led by Madam Kovarian wanted to completely avoid the Siege of Trenzalore by eliminating the Doctor: their attempts range from destroying reality in Series 5, which caused the events at Trenzalore, and using Melody Pond in an attempt to murder the Doctor in Series 6. The Silents still loyal to the Papal Mainframe remain and joined forces with the Doctor to fight back all the villains converging on Trenzalore.

Silurian

Siren 

The Siren is a virtual doctor that was aboard a spaceship of an unknown alien race that crashed in a dimension parallel to the ocean the ship Fancy was sailing on in 1699. Thanks to "protein circuitry", she could appear before a species in a form that would be alluring to them for cooperation. To sedate her patients, the Siren could sing a beautiful vocal song. However, being nothing more than a program, the Siren had very little reasoning skills. The Siren turned red with demonic-looking face when faced with resistance and germs. When the ship she was doctor to crashed in a spatial rift where the Fancy had been becalmed (and the crew dead from a human disease), she impulsively started to take the injured of the ship, even if it was for a simple cut, showing a great lack of intelligence. Were it not for the Doctor's arrival, the Siren would eventually have reached shore and started trying to process anyone who was ill. Captain Henry Avery, Toby Avery and the crew of the Fancy took over the ship to give her someone to look after, and to see the universe.

Sirian 

A race of humanoids from the star Sirius.

Sisterhood of Karn 

A female religion in charge of the Elixir of Eternal Life. The Elixir has remarkable healing properties, such as aiding Time Lords undergoing difficult regenerations; the Fourth Doctor was given some after brain damage in a mental duel with Morbius. Other potions that the Sisterhood brew can allow Time Lords to choose what their next incarnation will be like; they range from age, weight, strength, emotion, sex and mindset. Seeing the person he had been for all his regenerations wasn't suited to combat the terror of the Time War, the Eighth Doctor choose a potion that would turn him into a Warrior.

Skarasen 

A creature brought to Earth by the Zygons that became the Loch Ness Monster.

Skithra

Skonnan

Skullion 

Skullions are short one-eyed extraterrestrials, originating from the planet Skultos. They are hydrophobic, meaning water will burn the Skullions in a torturous way. It is stated they can only drink citric juices.

In The Man Who Never Was (2011), a Skullion ship crashed into China where the aliens were sold at a black market to Mr Harrison, who uses them as slaves, attaching collars to their necks as torturing devices.
Sarah Jane Smith and her friends were able to save them though, contacting their home planet. A rescue ship arrives, beaming up the Skullions and Mr Harrison, who refused to let them escape.

Sky Fish 

The Sky Fish are fish-like creature capable of swimming through the air using the electricity of the planet Ember's crystalline fog. They are attracted to music as it causes the crystals in the fog to resonate in a way that produces delta waves. They vary from small fish to fully grown sharks.

Slitheen 

The Slitheen are a family of massive, bipedal extraterrestrials. They are creatures of living calcium, hatched from eggs and native to the planet Raxacoricofallapatorius. While, strictly speaking, the name "Slitheen" refers to a specific family, the term has been used by the Doctor to refer to the Raxacoricofallapatorian race in general.

The Slitheen are able to wear a human's skin as a disguise, using a compression field to shrink themselves. As they are mostly made of calcium, they are vulnerable to acetic acid (vinegar).

The Slitheen have appeared in the Doctor Who episodes "Aliens of London", "World War Three" and "Boom Town" and the interactive episode, "Attack of the Graske" (all 2005). "From Raxacoricofallapatorius with Love", a mini episode of The Sarah Jane Adventures for Comic Relief, featured Ronnie Corbett as a small Slitheen. They have also appeared in The Sarah Jane Adventures episodes Revenge of the Slitheen and The Lost Boy.

The Slitheen are mentioned as being part of The Alliance formed to trap the Doctor in "The Pandorica Opens" (2010).

Slyther 
The Slyther was a monster that served the Daleks. It was seen in episodes four and five of The Dalek Invasion of Earth (1964), guarding the Dalek mines in Bedfordshire. After the Slyther attacked a small group of humans, killing Ashton, Ian hit it with a rock, causing it to fall down a pit to its death.

Solonian 

The Solonians are a race of humanoid creatures from the planet Solos, colonized by the Overlords. The atmosphere contains a nitrogen isotope which causes the air to become toxic to humans in sunlight, although it has no effect on Solonians. Because Solos' environment changes drastically every 500 years, they must undergo major mutations periodically in order to survive.

Sontaran 

A Sontaran first appeared as the antagonist in the Third Doctor serial The Time Warrior (1973–74). The Sontarans were referred to in Eye of the Gorgon by Bea who said they looked like a huge potato with a raygun. Commander Kaagh appears in Series 2 in the story The Last Sontaran after the destruction of his battle fleet as well as the death of the other Sontarans on board in the Doctor Who two-parter episodes "The Sontaran Strategem" and "The Poison Sky" (2008). He returns in Enemy of the Bane, where he sides up with Mrs Wormwood, the recurring Bane. In the end, he sacrifices himself to foil her plans of the destruction of Earth. He makes a small appearance in "The Pandorica Opens" (2010). The Sontarans remain slightly miffed that they weren't allowed to fight in the Time War.

As seen with Strax, Sontarans can't tell the difference between men and women ("Two genders is a bit further than [they] can count"), and think polite terms such as Miss or Mister are military ranks.

Spiridon 
The Spiridons featured in the serial Planet of the Daleks (1973). They are the dominant species of sentient humanoids on planet Spiridon in the Ninth System. They have developed a form of invisibility, capable of generating "anti-reflecting light waves". They become visible after death, having pale skin and a gaunt appearance. They wear heavy purple fur cloaks at night to protect themselves from the harsh nights of Spiridon. The Doctor returns to Spiridon in spin-off audio adventures Return of the Daleks and Brotherhood of the Daleks.

Star Whale 

The Star Whale is a giant whale-like creature, presumed to be the last of its kind, used to pilot the Starship UK, so as to save its citizens from the dangerous solar flares. The whale has the features of other animals such as an anglerfish's angler, an octopus's tentacles and a scorpion's tail, as well as having a bright pink hide with bioluminescent patches. It arrived on Earth as it heard the children of the United Kingdom crying, and was unable to bear the sound. Believing its arrival to be a one-in-a-million miracle, the people of Britain captured it and built their ship around it, torturing it via powerful electric pulses, administered directly into the opened pain center of the Whale's brain, in order to keep the ship flying. Over the years, they realised that they could not justify keeping the creature in agony, but feared that if they set it free, the ship and all those aboard would be destroyed as the creature fled, so they chose to instead forget, and fed those who protested to the beast. When the Doctor learnt of this, he decided to render the creature brain-dead, ending its suffering and saving the lives of all those on the ship, but Amy set it free, revealing that the whale had volunteered to help, and that contrary to the beliefs of the station's masters, that it would continue flying without the need to torture it. The creature's exact size is not specified, and it is only visible in its entirety towards the episode's ending.

Stenza 

The Stenza are a warrior race who possess sub-zero body temperatures. As physical contact with any part of them can cause death from sub-zero burns, Stenza require the use of specialised suits to be able to interact safely with other lifeforms. The Stenza maintain two traditions amongst their people – a ritualistic hunt to earn the right of leadership, in which a Stenza hunts a randomly selected quarry without the use of weapons or any form of aid; and collecting a tooth from a kill to later apply to their face. The Stenza are noted for conducting ethnic cleansing on planets they conquer, as revealed in "The Ghost Monument", using the conquered populace to create weapons for their use.

Stigorax 

A species that appears similar to large, furry rats; they are carnivorous. The last of the Stigorax was adopted by Helen A, who named it Fifi and took care of it. Fifi was released into sewer pipes to chase and devour escaping criminals. Fifi was later fatally wounded by a collapsing pipe, managing to climb out just in time for Helen A to find it. Fifi's death showed Helen A that sadness could not be prevented.

Swampie 

Green-skinned, green-haired natives of the third moon of Delta Magma. Other than their colour, they appear similar to humans. Swampies are intelligent but primitive, lacking technology. They worship a giant squid-like creature called Kroll. Throughout The Power of Kroll, only male Swampies are seen.

The Swarm 

Also known by the Unified Intelligence-Taskforce (UNIT) as Stingrays, they are flying manta ray-like creatures, with metal exoskeletons that allow them to travel from planet to planet via wormholes. They consume everything on a planet, turning it into desert; and then swarm over the planet's surface, generating a wormhole which allows them to travel to the next planet.

The Stingrays are apparently arthropods, as they are exothermic, and possess an exoskeleton composed of metal that has been ingested then exuded to the exoskeleton. They are voracious feeders, eating both organic and inorganic materials ranging from flesh and bone to plant matter to metals and plastic. They also produce vast numbers of young and grow from birth to adult in under a year, as shown when the Tenth Doctor shows a year-old clip of San Helios before its Stingray infestation.

They travel to other planets through wormholes created in the fabric of Spacetime by circling a planet faster and faster, and as each swarm can contain billions of giant stingrays, they rip a hole in space. Their wormholes can transport the whole swarm an infinite distance through space.

Sycorax 

The Sycorax first appeared in the debut Tenth Doctor story "The Christmas Invasion" in 2005.

The Sycorax appear to be skinless humanoids wearing mantles of bone, usually keeping their features concealed under helmets. They are proficient in the use of weapons like swords and whips, the latter which can deliver an energy discharge that disintegrates the flesh of its target. Their language is called Sycoraxic. The Sycorax also appear to have technology that is either disguised or treated as magic, referring to "curses" and the Doctor's regenerative abilities as "witchcraft". The Sycorax leader referred to an "armada" that they could use to take Earth by force if their blood control plan failed. They also appear to have a martial society, with traditions of honourable combat, yet they have no qualms about killing prisoners.

According to a write-up by Russell T Davies on the BBC website, the Sycorax facial structure was inspired by the skull of a horse. According to the same write-up, the Sycorax originated on an asteroid in the distant JX82 system, known as the Fire Trap. They were uplifted when a spaceship crashed on their asteroid and the Sycorax Leader enslaved the survivors, forcing the aliens to teach them about their technology. The asteroid was then retrofitted into the first of many spaceships, which the Sycorax then used to raid other planets, becoming feared interstellar scavengers. This reputation is made clear in their attitude to other 'inferior' races. The Sycorax leader comments to Rose that he would not 'dirty his tongue' with her language, and their translated word for 'human' can also be taken to mean 'cattle'. Their armada is permanently in orbit around the Jewel of Staa Crafell.

In The Doctor Who Files books, the name of the Sycorax homeworld is given as "Sycorax". It is unclear if this is another name for the Fire Trap. Furthermore, after the destruction of the Fire Trap, the Sycorax spread further through the galaxy, and like humans are one of three species that continually survive and adapt, even unto the End of the Universe.

The name Sycorax is used in William Shakespeare's play The Tempest. Shakespeare's Sycorax has died before the play begins; she is described as a witch who was the mother of the beast Caliban. The Shakespearean name is referenced in the third series episode "The Shakespeare Code" when the Doctor finds a horse's skull in The Globe's prop cupboard. He comments that it "Reminds [him] too much of the Sycorax". Shakespeare remarks he likes the sound of the word, obviously then going on to use it in The Tempest.

The Sycorax also make a brief appearance in "The Pandorica Opens" (2010) as part of The Alliance formed to trap the Doctor.  Later, in "The Name of the Doctor" (2013), the Great Intelligence mentions them as one of those that left the Doctor blood-soaked. A Sycorax appears as a prisoner alongside the Doctor in "Revolution of the Daleks" (2021).

In issue #1 of the IDW published Doctor Who comic book, a Sycorax is collecting near-extinct species to use with shape-shifters for expensive hunts. The Sycorax race also make a return in the Tenth Doctor comic strip "The Widow's Curse", in Doctor Who Magazine #395. The DWM comic story is the first appearance of female Sycorax, who seem to operate separately from the males.

In the audio series Classic Doctors, New Monsters, the Seventh Doctor faces the Sycorax in the audio "Harvest of the Sycorax", where he has to stop their efforts to take control of a space station that contains blood samples taken from virtually the entire human race of the far future.

T

The Tancreds

Taran

Taran Beast

Tenza 

The Tenza are an alien species that has their young raised by other species. Put simply, "a Tenza's sole function is to fit in." They adapt perfectly to what their foster parents want, such as "George" becoming the son Claire was unable to give birth to. Tenzas have powerful psychic abilities such being able to create monsters with just their imagination, as well as mentally creating massive perception filters that alter their foster parents' memories. Since George didn't seem aware of his nature as a Tenza, the young of his species must do these things subconsciously or simply forget their true identities to blend in perfectly. The Doctor has said that Tenza puberty is "always a funny time", and said he might be back to deal with George again if something else goes awry.

Terileptil

The Terileptils appeared in the Fifth Doctor serial The Visitation by Eric Saward. They are a reptilian humanoid species, they cannot survive long without breathing soliton gas, which is highly combustible when combined with oxygen. As an advanced society, they enjoy a heightened appreciation of both aesthetics and warfare, and have been known to employ bejewelled androids. Criminal punishment in Terileptil society includes life imprisonment working in tinclavic mines on the planet Raaga, often with sub-standard medical care.

In 1666, a group of Terileptil prison escapees hidden near London attempted to use a genetically enhanced version of the Black Plague to destroy humanity. The destruction of their lab in Pudding Lane caused the Great Fire of London.

The Terileptils destroyed the Sonic screwdriver which did not appear again until the Doctor Who TV movie.

The Terileptils are mentioned as being part of The Alliance formed to trap the Doctor in "The Pandorica Opens" (2010).  They were also present during the siege of Trenzalore. A Terileptil is briefly shown as one of the criminals displayed by Psi in "Time Heist" (2014).

According to the Virgin Missing Adventures novel The Dark Path by David A. McIntee, by the 34th century, their homeworld Terileptus is a member of the Galactic Federation, and a noted builder of starships. A Terileptil also appears as the chief engineer on a Federation starship. The planet is destroyed during the events described in the novel.

Terraberserker 

A race that lives in the Kondonian Belt, but is very few in number. The Eleventh Doctor knows their language and customs well, exchanging a greeting with one at the Festival of Offerings.

Terradonian

Tetrap 

The Tetraps are a bat-like race from the planet Tetrapyriarbus. A pack of Tetraps was employed by the Rani to help defend her Giant Brain in the Seventh Doctor's debut story, Time and the Rani (1987) by Pip and Jane Baker. The Rani armed a pack of Tetraps for this purpose and used them as general henchmen to terrorise the native Lakertyans.

Tetraps have four eyes, one on each side of their head, giving them all-round vision, and put this to good use in stalking fugitives. Like bats, they sleep by hanging upside-down in a cavern. They feed off a dark red-coloured sludge that the Lakertyan leader releases down a chute into a trough.

Tetraps possess limited intelligence, but they soon realise that the Rani's plans would have them all killed on Lakertya. This is confirmed when their leader, Urak, hears of her plans and she later leaves him to guard over her laboratory rather than take him with her in her TARDIS, thus condemning him to death. Urak and the enraged Tetraps capture the Rani in her ship and take her back to their home planet, to force her to help solve their natural resource shortages.

Thal 

The Thals are a race of peaceful, blond humanoids who, together with the Daleks, are natives of the planet Skaro. Once a warlike species, a nuclear conflict with the Daleks, which nearly wiped out all life on their home planet, led them to develop a pacifist, agrarian society.

Tharil

Thoros Alphan

Tigellan

Time Beetle 

The Time Beetle is a member of the Trickster's Brigade, a group of aliens that serve the Trickster. The Time Beetle, similar to the Trickster himself, feeds on time energy and can cause a victim to change a decision they made in the past, thereby altering history. The change in history is usually very minor, affecting only the person the beetle attaches to, and the universe usually "compensates" for the discrepancy.

When the beetle attaches to Donna in "Turn Left" (2008), instead of compensating it creates a "great big parallel world" where Donna never meets the Doctor, resulting in disaster for Earth. The Doctor, Martha Jones, Sarah Jane Smith, and Torchwood staff Ianto Jones and Gwen Cooper were all killed, the city of London was completely destroyed when the Titanic crashes into Buckingham Palace, Captain Jack Harkness is taken to the Sontaran homeworld, and millions of people die from threats the Doctor would have otherwise prevented. Donna travels back in time to make her make the original decision that leads to her meeting the Doctor, killing the Beetle. According to both the Doctor and Donna, this universe ceased to exist.

In an accompanying "Monster Files" episode, Captain Jack raised doubts over whether the whole of the Trickster's Brigade consists of beetles, suggesting all individuals are of different species.

In the Torchwood episode "Immortal Sins" (2011), the Trickster's Brigade is mentioned as they attempt to cause the victory of Nazi Germany by assassinating Franklin Delano Roosevelt through a parasite.

Time Brain 

A creation of the Rani's by pooling the intelligence of all the most brilliant minds of history together. She sought to find the light-weight counterpart to Strange Matter, in order to capture a large amount of it,

Time Lord 

The Time Lords are a race of humanoid aliens to which the Doctor, among other characters, belongs. Time Lords have the ability to regenerate when mortally wounded. This process creates for them an entirely new body and results in major changes in personality, but retains the Time Lord's memories and identity. It is suggested in The Power of the Daleks (1966) that some detectable feature is retained, as the Daleks are immediately able to recognize the Second Doctor, even though he has just regenerated. During "The Time of the Doctor" (2013), it was confirmed by the Eleventh Doctor that a Time-Lord, naturally, is only allowed 12 regenerations, resulting in 13 different incarnations. In the same episode, the Doctor saves Clara's life by sending her home to her own time, but in protest she clings to the TARDIS through the Time Vortex on its return. Upon arriving 300 years later, she finds a visibly aged Doctor, proving that Time Lords experience natural physical changes during each lifespan between regenerations. In the episode "A Good Man Goes to War" (2011), it is suggested this ability evolved due to the Time Lord race's long-term exposure to the untempered schism.

Time Lords exhibit various other superhuman abilities, including certain mental powers, and resistance to otherwise harmful effects such as extreme cold and radiation. They possess a binary vascular system (two hearts), and therefore a faster heart rate, as well as a cooler internal body temperature. The Doctor would later claim that Time Lords came before humans did in "The Beast Below" (2010).

The first Time Lord to appear other than the Doctor and his granddaughter Susan Foreman is the Monk, in the 1965 serial The Time Meddler, however his race is not confirmed. The term itself is not used until The War Games (1969), when the race as a whole is introduced.

As of the 2005 revival series, the Time Lords are essentially extinct, apart from the Doctor, as they have been destroyed by him during the Time War. However, "The Day of the Doctor" (2013) shows that this was a ruse; the Time Lords are still alive in pocket universe, where all of the Doctors put them to save them from destruction.

Time Zombies 
Creatures that appeared in "Journey to the Centre of the TARDIS" (2013). They are echoes of the possible future selves that the Doctor, Clara, Trickey and Gregor would have become from being exposed to the Eye of Harmony too long; they were burnt by it as their cells liquified. It appeared that they lacked most of their former intelligence, along with the ability to speak. However, each may have been driven by a particular motive – the Doctor wanted the part of the Arch Rec back from Gregor, Clara could have wanted revenge on the Van Baalens for being the cause of all the trouble, and Gregor and Tricky would want revenge for being mutated into a monster. Each could be identitified, although not as easily with the Doctor and Clara, because of how they changed; the Doctor is stuck holding his head, and the Van Baalens are stuck to each other.

Unlike the other time echoes, they could touch the present world, and killed Bram Van Baalen. They end up trapping their past selves in the Eye of Harmony's room by accident, setting up the existence of the Time Zombies. The Doctor realised how to avert the future, killing all but Clara's echo by knocking them off the rail. However, the Van Baalens couldn't avoid their fate. The Doctor eventually prevented the existence of these things by resetting time, preventing the TARDIS from being damaged and salvaged by the Van Baalen Brothers.

Tivolian 

The Tivolians are a cowardly rodent-faced race that live on Tivoli, the most invaded planet in the galaxy. As a result, they have designed their cities to be comfortable for invading armies and their national anthem is "Glory To <Insert Name Here>". They are known for surrendering as soon as possible, and actually enjoy being conquered. As a result of the natives' cowardly attitudes, the planet Tivoli has lasted longer than any of the greater civilizations. They do not assert their own opinions often, just wishing to be ordered around or enslaved, as seen in the case of Gibbis and Albar Prentis. The Twelfth Doctor says that Tivolians wouldn't say "Boo" to a goose—they'd be more likely to give the goose their car keys and bank account information. Among the list of those who ruled the Tivolians are the Fisher King and the "glorious Arcateenians”.

Toclafane 

The Toclafane are the last remnants of humanity from the year 100 trillion. Originally intending to travel to Utopia, the last refuge of a dying universe, they find nothing but "the dark and the cold" of space. Losing the last shred of hope they had, they turned on themselves, cannibalising their own bodies to create a new cyborg race. As part of this process they regress into little more than children with shared memories. The name Toclafane is given to them by The Master, who takes it from the Gallifreyan equivalent of the bogeyman.

The Toclafane's cyborg forms possess energy devices capable of killing and disintegrating targets. They are equipped with numerous retractable blades. The first four to be seen also exhibit apparent teleportation or cloaking abilities, not displayed by others of their race. All that remains of their bodies are barely recognisable human faces wired into basketball-sized mechanical spheres.

In "The Sound of Drums" and "Last of the Time Lords" (2007), the Master rescues four Toclafane from the end of the universe prior to an eventual Big Freeze, using them to fake a first contact situation in order to draw the world's leaders into one place for easy capture. He then uses a "paradox machine" to allow the future of the human race to slaughter many in the present, in short bringing the six billion humans that are alive in the year 100 trillion to return in the form of the Toclafane. The paradox machine creates a temporal paradox, allowing them to kill their ancestors without damaging themselves, and thus establish the Master's rule over Earth. After subduing Earth, the Master aims to establish a new Time Lord empire with himself as the leader and the Toclafane as his people and ground troops. This plan is foiled when the paradox machine is destroyed, causing time to rewind and trapping the Toclafane back at the end of the universe.

The Toclafane feature on the cover of the New Series Adventures novel, The Story of Martha, which chronicles Martha Jones's adventures during The Year That Never Was.

Torajii 
A sentient star featured in the episode "42". The crew of a cargo ship uses a sun scoop on Torajii to refuel their ship, unaware that it is actually a living organism. Torajii then uses the stolen matter to possess and kill the crew until the fuel is returned. Once the sun scoop is dumped, it allows the ship to fly away.

Tractator

Trakenite 

A humanoid species, with great intelligence, that live on the peaceful planet of Traken, which is part of the Traken Union. A Keeper is chosen to guard the Source once the life of the current one draws close to ending. Their planet would petrify anything evil that would arrive, until the Keeper's life began waning and thus the petrification would weaken. During Logopolis (1981), the Master caused the destruction of the Traken Union and its people by unleashing entropy back into the universe, leaving Nyssa (as far as she or anyone knew) the sole Trakenite in existence.

Travist Polong 

Travist Polong is an orange, metre-long, five-eyed slug/slater-like alien. Sarah Jane Smith attempted to catch it at a hospital at Tarminster in The Mark of the Berserker (2008), but left to deal with a Berserker.

Travist Polong was later delivered to Sarah Jane in The Wedding of Sarah Jane Smith (2009) after she saw it on eBay in its dormant stage. Rani Chandra and Clyde Langer took it inside Rani's house, but it escaped. They chased it to 13 Bannerman Road, where they caught it in a garbage can. Sarah Jane directed Rani to order Mr Smith to teleport it to Polongus, its home planet. Sarah Jane described Travist Polong as "not evil, just trouble".

The Trickster 
The Trickster is a being beyond the universe which seeks to manifest itself through causing chaos. It can interfere in deaths, by making deceptive deals to prolong life at a price. It can only exist within the universe for brief periods, without physical form, sometimes in a mirror or other reflective surface. It is a member of the Pantheon of Discord. Played by Paul Marc Davis, the Trickster is a recurring nemesis in The Sarah Jane Adventures. Though the character does not directly appear in the series's related programmes (parent show Doctor Who and adult sister show Torchwood), the Trickster's attempts to change history have nevertheless been depicted.

In Whatever Happened to Sarah Jane?, in order to create chaos of sufficient magnitude, the Trickster removed Sarah Jane Smith from history so that an asteroid that only she could have stopped would hit the Earth. The Trickster altered an incident in Sarah Jane's childhood in 1964 that originally led to the death of her best friend, Andrea Yates. The Trickster switched the places of the two girls after gaining Andrea's consent, creating a timeline in which Sarah Jane died at age 13. Preferring a meaningless destruction of Earth rather than for profit or military conquest, the Trickster also influenced the various alien threats Sarah Jane had faced on Earth to simply stay-away from the planet, creating a peaceful timeline up until the impending asteroid strike. Keeping Sarah Jane in Limbo, it further planned to use her to find and remove The Doctor from history, which would create a timeline of diabolical chaos, wherein the many tragedies the Doctor averted would have instead proceeded.

The Time Beetle that consumes time energy by changing an individual's personal timeline in the Doctor Who episode "Turn Left" is described in the episode as one of "the Trickster's Brigade".

In The Temptation of Sarah Jane Smith, the Trickster returned with the Graske. It manifested in 1951 after Sarah Jane saved her parents' lives. By 2008 it had completely devastated the planet and enslaved the human population, and was working on conquering other planets. Sarah Jane returned to the point of his manifestation in an attempt to stop him, but could not think of a suitable method. Her parents willingly drive off in their car, leading to their death, causing the Trickster to vanish and the original time to be restored. The Trickster materialised through the Abbot's Gate at the old monastery in Sarah Jane's home village of Foxgrove. This entry point was razed for the construction of an A road in 1964.

The Trickster returned in The Wedding of Sarah Jane Smith, having made a deal with lawyer Peter Dalton after an accident at home, granting Dalton his life and the love he never had, Sarah Jane. Sarah Jane fell in love with Dalton, and agreed to marry him, but the wedding was interrupted by the arrival of the Tenth Doctor. The Trickster took the hotel out of time, trapping Sarah Jane and Peter in one second while the Doctor, Luke, Clyde, Rani and K9 were trapped in another. Realising that the Trickster intended for Sarah's marriage to end her life of defending the Earth, Sarah Jane convinced Peter that he must break the deal, sacrificing himself so that Sarah Jane could continue to save the world. The Trickster made reference to the Tenth Doctor's upcoming future regeneration and added that the Doctor's first meeting with the Pantheon of Discord had sent ripples back through time. The Trickster was revealed to be vulnerable to artron energy (the power source of the TARDIS). Clyde became charged with artron energy when he came in contact with the TARDIS while it was attempting to penetrate the Trickster's time rift. He was able to use the energy to harm the Trickster, draining its energy long enough for the Doctor to penetrate the Trickster's temporal trap.

The Trickster is briefly referenced in the Torchwood: Miracle Day episode "Immortal Sins". In the episode, Captain Jack Harkness and his lover/companion Angelo Colasanto intercept and destroy an alien parasite that the Trickster's brigade had planned to use to infect U.S. President Franklin D. Roosevelt and create an alternate timeline where Nazi Germany won World War II.

A shot of the Trickster is briefly shown in the 2014 Doctor Who episode "Time Heist", describing him as one of many of the galaxy's most notorious criminals. Considering he desires nothing but chaos, the Trickster is likely the most wanted criminal.

The Trickster's Brigade 
The Trickster's Brigade serve the recurring The Sarah Jane Adventures villain, The Trickster. They also feed on chaos in time as the Trickster does. In "Turn Left", a Time Beetle, a member of The Trickster's Brigade, attaches itself onto the back of companion Donna Noble, creating a parallel world where she never met the Doctor in "The Runaway Bride", leading to his death.

In the Torchwood episode "Immortal Sins", Captain Jack Harkness and Angelo Colasanto discover that The Trickster's Brigade plans to cause the victory of Nazi Germany by assassinating Franklin Delano Roosevelt with the use of a brain parasite but Jack shoots it in the head, killing it instantly.

Trion 

A humanoid species, with no visible differences from humans, Trions are quite intelligent. A civil war broke out on the planet, and those on the wrong side were banished to different planets, Turlough ended up on Earth, while the rest of his family ended up on a volcanic planet. The descendants of the original exiles came to believe the mark of exile meant those who had it were chosen by their god, Mulkur, to lead them. After several years past, the exile was lifted from those banished from the planet, allowing them back home.

Tritovore 

Humanoid fly creatures, they trade with other civilisations for their excrement. They communicate with clicks that the TARDIS did not translate because it was not on the same planet as the Tenth Doctor and Lady Christina de Souza. The Doctor speaks with them through their own language while they understand The Doctor through a one-way telepathic translating communication device.

Tythonian

U

Ultramancer

Urbankan

Usurian 

The Usurians from the planet Usurius are a species that abandoned military conquest in favour of economic conquest. They enslaved humanity after their engineers made Mars suitable for human habitation, humans having depleted the Earth's resources. Once humanity had depleted Mars's resources as well, the Usurians engineered Pluto so that humans could inhabit it. They created six artificial "Suns" around it and installed the Collector to oversee the collection of taxes from their human workforce. They intended to abandon Pluto and leave humanity to become extinct once the humans had exhausted its resources, there being no economically viable planet to relocate humanity to once more. The humans on Pluto revolted against the Collector and seized control of Pluto. The revolutionaries intended to relocate to Earth as the Doctor assured them it would have regenerated in their absence.

The Usurians have knowledge of the Time Lords, graded as "Grade 3" in their "latest market survey", considering Gallifrey to be of low commercial value. Usurians can adopt a humanoid form but in their natural state they resemble seaweed. Shock can force them to revert to their natural form. According to the Doctor, Usurians are listed in a "flora and fauna" of the universe written by a Professor Thripthead under poisonous fungi.

Uvodni 

The Uvodni is a bug-like race, first introduced in Warriors of Kudlak (2007). General Kudlak served in his race's military until injuries forced him to retire. In order to gain more troops for his race's continuing war effort, Kudlak was dispatched to Earth. He seized control of the Combat 3000 laser game franchise, which he secretly used to find human children with strong combat skills. These children were teleported to Kudlak's orbiting spaceship and dispatched to fight in his race's war. Kudlak took orders from a battle computer that used the image of a female of his race as an avatar, which he referred to as "Mistress". An error left the computer unable to comprehend the concept of the war ending, so it withheld from Kudlak an announcement of peace from his emperor for over a decade. When this fact was revealed, by intervention of Luke Smith's computer hacking, Kudlak destroyed the computer. He then dedicated his life to finding and returning the already dispatched human children, hoping to gain inner peace by doing so.

An Uvodni appeared in "The Pandorica Opens" (2010) as part of the Alliance formed to trap the Doctor.

The Uvodni are mentioned in the audio book The White Wolf, when Ben remarks that the Uvodni could have helped them get home.

The Uvodni are mentioned in the audio book Wraith World, when Clyde Langer remarks he cannot understand why Luke and Rani would want to read about made up adventures, when they have faced Uvodni.

Uxariean

V

Validium 

Living metal created by the Time Lords, capable of many tasks due to its origins. Such metal ended up on Earth and Lady Peinforte used it to make a statue of herself, the Nemesis Statue. The Doctor, through his various incarnations, sent the statue off Earth every 25 years, only for it to return, due to the bow and arrow being missing and thus draw the statue back; every great disaster in Earth's history that's 25 years apart was caused by it.

In 1988, the Doctor was able to recover all the pieces and have the statue explode in the middle of a Cyberman fleet.

Vampire 
A number of different types of vampire have appeared in televised Doctor Who:
 In the fourth episode of the 1965 First Doctor serial The Chase, the First Doctor, Ian, Barbara and Vicki encounter Count Dracula and Frankenstein's Monster, who make short work of a pursuing party of Daleks. The Doctor speculates that the monsters and the haunted mansion that they inhabit are the products of nightmares created from the human psyche. As the TARDIS and the Daleks' time capsule leave, it is revealed that the monsters are in fact funfair robots.
 The Fourth Doctor encounters vampires whilst travelling in E-Space in the 1980 serial State of Decay. The Doctor, Romana, Adric and K9 encounter three vampires, Aukon, Camilla and Zargo. It is revealed that the three are servants of the giant King Vampire who once fought a great war against the Time Lords but was the sole survivor of the war by escaping to E-Space. The Doctor defeats the King Vampire by launching the lesser vampires' tower—actually the command module of the ship piloted by the originally human trio – and using it as a stake to pierce the giant vampire's heart. The three servant vampires perish along with their king.
 Creatures similar to vampires, Saturnyns, appeared in the Eleventh Doctor episode "The Vampires of Venice", and another species known for drinking blood, the Plasmavore, was shown in "Smith and Jones".

Vampires have also appeared in Doctor Who stories in other media. Vampires related to the Great Vampires seen in State of Decay are featured prominently in the Virgin New Adventures novel Blood Harvest, the Missing Adventure Goth Opera, the BBC Eighth Doctor Adventures novel Vampire Science, and the Big Finish Productions audio dramas Project: Twilight and Project: Lazarus. The Eighth Doctor Adventure The Eight Doctors also features them in a flashback to State of Decay; in addition, the war between the vampires and the Time Lords is a significant plot element in the New Adventure Damaged Goods. Other vampires or vampire-like creatures have been featured in the Missing Adventure Managra, the audio drama UNIT: Snake Head, the BBCi webcast Death Comes to Time, the short story The Feast of the Stone (featuring an alternate Ninth Doctor), the Bernice Summerfield anthology The Vampire Curse, and the Torchwood website.

Vampires also featured in the Big Finish Doctor Who 40th anniversary story Zagreus. Here an account is given that the Vampires originally fed on mindless creatures they bred themselves, until the Time Lords attacking them forced them to feed on sentient species. It is also claimed here that Rassilon developed regeneration from the Vampires.

Vanir

Vardan

Varga Plant 

The Varga Plants (sometimes Vaarga) appeared in the First Doctor episode "Mission to the Unknown" and the serial The Daleks' Master Plan (1965–66), which were essentially a prologue and main epic respectively. They were created by Terry Nation.

Varga Plants grew naturally on the Daleks' homeworld, Skaro, and when the Daleks set up a base on the planet Kembel they brought some Varga plants with them to act as sentries in the jungle surrounding their base. They were suited to this as they could move around freely by dragging themselves along with their roots.

Varga plants resemble cacti; they are covered in fur and thorns. Anyone pricked by a Varga thorn will be consumed by the urge to kill, while simultaneously becoming a Varga plant themself. This grisly fate befell astronauts Jeff Garvey and Gordon Lowery, and their commander, Marc Cory, was forced to kill them.

The plants later made an appearance in the Big Finish audio I, Davros: Purity. In this, it was revealed that the Varga plants were one of the oldest species on Skaro, but for most of their history had been immobile. Since the start of the Kaled-Thal war however, exposure to radiation and chemical weapons had caused them to rapidly evolve into a much deadlier form, capable of self-locomotion. It was this discovery that caused Davros to become interested in genetically engineering creatures in order to create weapons of war. In Dalek Empire II: Dalek War, they were found on a terraformed Jupiter where they infected earth troops. They appeared in City of the Daleks where after the Time War they infested the ruined Dalek city of Kaalann on Skaro but here their appearance was much different.

Varosian 

Varosians are the descendants of prisoners that were kept on the planet, though the truth of this has faded with time, with only a few knowing the truth.

Vashta Nerada 

Vashta Nerada (literally: the shadows that melt the flesh) are microscopic swarm creatures which, when present in a high enough concentration, are indistinguishable from shadows, and use this to their advantage in approaching and attacking prey. They are described as the "piranhas of the air", able to strip their victims to the bone in an instant in high enough densities. The Tenth Doctor says that almost every planet in the universe has some, including Earth, and claims that they can be seen as the specks of dust visible in bright light. He states they are the reason most sentient creatures have an instinctual fear of the dark. On most planets, however, Vashta Nerada exist in relatively low concentrations, feeding primarily on carrion, with attacks on people being comparatively rare. In the episode "Silence in the Library", an unusually high concentration of Vashta Nerada had completely overrun the 51st-century "Library", resulting in the apparent death of everyone inside at the time.

Vashta Nerada normally live in forested areas, and reproduce by means of microscopic spores which can lie dormant in wood pulp. In the episode "Forest of the Dead", this is revealed to be the reason for their unusual prevalence in The Library, as it is made known that the books and The Library itself was constructed of wood from the Vashta Nerada's native forest feeding grounds. Individually, Vashta Nerada are non-sentient, but if a large enough concentration come together, they can form a group mind of human-level intelligence capable of communication.

The fourth episode of Doctor Who: The Adventure Games, "Shadows of the Vashta Nerada", features them as the leading villain when a temporal rift draws a swam of Vashta Nerada to an underwater base that is being visited by the Eleventh Doctor and Amy Pond.

The Vashta Nerada appear in the second volume of the Big Finish Productions audio Classic Doctors, New Monsters; "Night of the Vashta Nerada" sees the Fourth Doctor visiting a theme park that has unleashed the local Vashta Nerada after the planet's forests were torn down to allow the park to be constructed, and "Day of the Vashta Nerada" pits the Eighth Doctor against genetically-altered Vashta Nerada that have been created as a new weapon in the Time War.

Veil 
Veils are able to step into the bodies of others, controlling them. They can also induce a trance by touching their victims. This can be done with their extremely long tongue. In the episode, Prisoner of the Judoon, Androvax, the last Veil, was a fugitive responsible for destroying twelve planets, and was pursued by the Judoon after the Judoon prison ship containing him crashed on Earth. He then returned on the episode The Vault of Secrets, seeking help from Sarah Jane, Clyde and Rani due to the fact that he was ill and wanted to return to his own kind. Androvax was successful in awakening the survivors of the Veils as he searches for a new world for them to reside in.

In "Heaven Sent," the Twelfth Doctor encountered another creature that is a limping and disfigured creature in a shroud surrounded by flies also called the Veil while trapped in his Confession Dial. The creature modeled after an image of a rotting female corpse the Doctor saw in his childhood, the Veil's purpose is to force the Doctor to confess what he knew of the Hybrid.

Venom Grub

Venusian 
Venusians are inhabitants of the planet Venus, the closest planet to Earth. They had large feet, and six arms. The Third Doctor often employed a form of Venusian martial art (called Venusian aikido or Venusian karate) and sang Venusian lullabies (to the tune of God Rest Ye, Merry Gentlemen). Venusian aikido is allegedly very hard for two-armed beings to learn. Its use appeared in the serials Inferno, Day of the Daleks, and others. The Seventh Doctor favored a more subtle version which involved applying a single finger, seen in Survival. The Fourth Doctor revealed to Davros in Genesis of the Daleks that a battle between the Venusians and the Daleks "in the Space Year 17,000" was ended by the intervention of a group of battleships from the planet Hyperon. Although Venus today is utterly devoid of life, the Virgin Missing Adventures novel Venusian Lullaby shows Venus to have been inhabited billions of years ago, before the surface became too hot to support life.

Vervoid 

Artificially created plant-based humanoids who possess problem-solving intelligence and the power of speech; they were intended to perform tasks usually carried out by robots, but for a fraction of the cost. Unfortunately they instead decided to eradicate all of 'animalkind'. Vervoids had about the size and strength of humans, but were covered in leaves which provided them with energy through photosynthesis. They possessed thorns so poisonous they could kill a human on contact, and could produce copious amounts of methane-based swamp gas.

Vespiform 

Vespiform are an insectoid species resembling giant wasps, born en masse in hives in the Silfrax Galaxy. Each possesses the ability to morph into other species. It also has the ability to breed with other species, including humans, to produce offspring. The Monster Files feature establishes them as an ancient race and that they have fought the Quark rebels.

Vespiform have a telepathic connection to objects called firestones, which contains part of their mind. Like Earth's wasps, the Vespiform are vulnerable to water. A Vespiform-human hybrid can live a normal life as a human until a burst of intense emotion awakens its alien biology. When the Vespiform morphs into another species it emits a purple light.

In "The Unicorn and the Wasp", a Vespiform appears and goes on a killing spree in the style of Agatha Christie's murder mystery books. Eventually it turns out the reason for Vespiform's killings was due to his firestone in the possession of Lady Eddison, who was thinking about Christie's novels. Furthermore, the Vespiform is revealed to be Lady Eddison's illegitimate son: Reverend Golightly. In the end, trying to get the firestone back, the Vespiform dies chasing after the item when Donna Noble throws it into a lake.

The Vigil

Vinvocci 

Vinvocci are a race of spiky green aliens who first appeared in "The End of Time". A pair of Vinvocci came to Earth as part of a salvage operation to recover Vinvocci technology—a medical device for healing entire planets, which Joshua Naismith named the "Immortality Gate". They possess disguise technology referred to by the Tenth Doctor as a Shimmer. When the Doctor notes a similarity to Bannakaffalatta from Voyage of the Damned, noting the distinction that "he was small, and red", the Vinvocci are quick to differentiate themselves from the Zocci; both races may be at odds with each other, explaining the response. They also find it racist when someone calls them cacti.

Viperox 

Insectoid creatures that attempted to destroy Earth in 1958, in the Dry Springs of Nevada.

Vishklar 

Vishklars are a species of humanoid aliens that feed on the energy from human nightmares. One Vishklar, known as The Nightmare Man, targeted Luke Smith, and found his dreams most intriguing, as he was genetically engineered by the Bane, and not a biological human and therefore should not be able to dream.

Visian 

Visians are invisible creatures indigenous to the planet Mira. They are completely invisible, detectable only by their footprints and the sounds they make while moving through the jungle. The Doctor states that they are 8 feet tall and extremely hostile, evidenced by the fact that they attack both the Doctor's party and the Daleks indiscriminately.

Viyrans 
A highly advanced race of creatures which specialise in virus experimentation.  They have featured in the Fifth Doctor Audio Story Mission of the Viyrans and the Sixth Doctor Audio Stories Patient Zero and Blue Forgotten Planet.  They also appeared in Dark Eyes 2.

Vogan 

The natives of the planet Voga, where it was entirely made of gold. The Cybermen sought to destroy their planet, to hinder the organics' ability to combat them in the Cyber Wars.

Voord 

A race of amphibious humanoids introduced in the First Doctor serial The Keys of Marinus (1964).

W

Wallarian 
A race mentioned in Carnival of Monsters, known for their gambling.

Weeping Angel

Weevil

Werewolf 

Two different kinds of werewolves have appeared in Doctor Who during the series' 50-year run. In "The Greatest Show in the Galaxy", a woman named Mag had been found by a blowhard explorer on one of his trips; Mag became feral and changed slightly into a more animalistic appearance in moonlight, simulated or real. The Seventh Doctor was able to encourage Mag to regain control of herself, something she wondered she would be able to do again.

In "Tooth and Claw" (2006), a bacterial life form was worshiped by a religious order, and wanted to establish the Empire of the Wolf by infecting Queen Victoria. The Tenth Doctor was able to destroy it and its host by overloading it with moonlight. However, he suspected that a tiny bit of the lifeform was able to sneak into the Queen through a cut on her finger; the Doctor guessed that the lifeform wouldn't pose a threat until the 21st century.

Whisper Men 

The Whisper Men are eyeless beings who serve the Great Intelligence. They dress in Victorian attire and speak in rhyming whispers. Their faces are blank and white except for a mouth full of sharp teeth, and their hands can phase through a person's chest and stop their hearts at will. When the Great Intelligence inhabits one of the Whisper Men, it takes the form of Walter Simeon. The Whisper Men all vanish from existence when the Great Intelligence willingly destroys itself by scattering itself throughout the Eleventh Doctor's timeline at Trenzalore, the Doctor's final resting place.

Wirrn 

The Wirrn are an insectoid race that made their debut in the 1975 Fourth Doctor story The Ark in Space. The name is sometimes spelled Wirrrn, which is a spelling originating from the novelisation of the story.

The Wirrn claim to have originated from Andromeda (whether they meant the galaxy, the constellation, or even a planet named "Andromeda" is unclear), but were driven into space by human settlers. They are slightly larger than humans, dark green and wasp-like in appearance, and live mostly in space, although their breeding colonies are terrestrial. Their bodies are a self-contained system, their lungs being able to recycle waste carbon dioxide and only needing to touch down occasionally on planetary bodies for food and oxygen. The Wirrn's life cycle involves laying their eggs in living hosts; the larvae emerge to consume the host, absorbing its memories and knowledge. A Wirrn larva is a green slug-like creature, varying in size from a few inches to 1 or 2 metres across. It can "infect" another organism through contact with a substance it excretes, mutating them into an adult Wirrn and connecting their consciousness to the hive mind.

In The Ark in Space, the Wirrn found Space Station Nerva in orbit around an Earth devastated centuries before by solar flares. The survivors had lain in suspended animation waiting for the planet to recover, but had overslept by several millennia. The Wirrn intended to use the sleepers as a food source and claim the empty Earth for their own, as both a means of survival and an act of revenge against the human race for taking their former territories. In the course of their plan, Noah, leader of Nerva, was infected and converted to their kind. However, Noah still retained "more than a vestige of human spirit", probably thanks to the encouragements of the Doctor, and led the Wirrn into Nerva's transport ship even though he knew it was rigged to explode. It did so, ending the Wirrn threat.

The Wirrn have also appeared in the Eighth Doctor Adventures novel Placebo Effect by Gary Russell, and in the audio play Wirrn: Race Memory, produced by BBV. Big Finish used them in the audio stories Wirrn Dawn with the Eighth Doctor and Wirrn Isle with the Sixth. A dead Wirrn appears briefly in television story The Stones of Blood.

Wolfweed

Wyrrester 
An alien species, which resemble giant scorpions; they appear in the novel The Crawling Terror. According to the Twelfth Doctor, the Wyrresters are warmongers that have ravaged their entire star system; their venom has a hypnotic suggestion effect. Attempting to depart from their star system once it was out of habitable planets, the Wyrresters sent out a message in the 1940s, which was picked up by the Germans and the Allied Forces; the message contained instructions on how to build a teleportation device. Adolf Hitler believed it was a super weapon gifted to him by the heavens, but the British scientists knew better. Though the Doctor attempted to stop the experiment, a Wyrrester got through and stung a scientist before being slain by a bombing; this resulted in 70 years of experimentation trying to bring the minds of the Wyrresters to Earth via inhabiting mutated insect bodies. The Doctor's past self arrived to discover the situation, and time traveled to discover what had happened. With the aid of the local military, the Doctor was able to prevent the Wyrresters from teleporting by destroying the device.

X

Xeraphin 

The Xeraphin were an ancient species encountered by the Fifth Doctor in the story Time-Flight (1982) by Peter Grimwade. Originating from the planet Xeriphas, they possessed immense psychokinetic and scientific powers. The Doctor believed the race to have been wiped out during the crossfire during the Vardon/Kosnax war. Instead, the entire race fled to Earth in an escaping spacecraft. The ship crashed near present-day Heathrow some 140 million years ago. When the Xeraphin emerged they built a Citadel to mark their new home but the Xeraphin were so plagued with radiation that they abandoned their original humanoid bodies and transformed into a single bioplasmic gestalt intelligence within a sarcophagus at the heart of the Citadel.

The arrival of the Master coincided with their emergence from the gestalt state when the radiation effects had subsided, and his influence caused the emergence of a split personality of good and evil, each side competing for their tremendous power while yearning to become a proper species once again. The Master, who was stranded on Earth at the time too, succeeded in capturing the Xeraphin as a new power source for his TARDIS. However, the Doctor's intervention meant his nemesis' TARDIS was sent to Xeriphas where events became out of his control.

Before fleeing Xeriphas and the Xeraphin, the Master took with him Kamelion, a Xeraphin war weapon with advanced shape-changing abilities dependent on the will of its controller. Kamelion was freed from the Master and joined the Doctor's TARDIS crew in The King's Demons (1983).

Xeron

Xylok 

Xyloks are a crystalline race that crashed into Earth as a meteorite about 60 million years ago. Consequently, the Xyloks that survived the crash were trapped beneath the surface of the Earth, regrowing over thousands of millennia.

After the eruption of mount Krakatoa in 1883, one of the Xyloks was found in the post-volcanic aftermath. It was eventually passed to Sarah Jane Smith by a geologist friend when she was researching volcanic activity, 18 months prior to the events of The Lost Boy. During her studies of the crystalline structure, she found that it could use her laptop to communicate. The Xylok agreed to help Sarah Jane protect Earth, and was integrated into the supercomputer Mr Smith, built by Sarah Jane under the instruction of the Xylok. Unbeknownst to Sarah Jane, this was a plot, in anticipation that it would one day be able to release the imprisoned Xylok race. Sarah Jane and her companions were able to thwart its intentions; as a result, Mr Smith was reprogrammed and became a benefit to the human race once again.

Z

Zanak Humanoid

Zaralok 

The Zaralok was a shark-like creature that prowled the waters around the flooded 23rd-century London, now little more than a network of underwater tunnels codenamed 'Poseidon'. When the Doctor and Amy land the TARDIS in Poseidon, the Zaralok immediately attacks, attempting to ram its way into the glass tunnels. While constantly having to evade the monster, the two slowly unravell the mystery of Poseidon, which has fallen under threat from not only the Zaralok, but also the Vashta Nerada and otherworldly radiation. They eventually discover that all the anomalies arrived at the city when the USS Eldridge, an American WWII-era ship which had vanished through a wormhole to another world hundreds of years ago, suddenly jumped back through into the sea several days ago. However, the ship became lodged in the wormhole and held it open, allowing the creatures and the radiation to seep through. The Doctor and Amy travel to the wreckage of the Eldridge and are able to close the wormhole; the Zaralok is seen being dragged back to its own world, while the other anomalies disappear with it. The name of the creature is probably derived from Žralok, a shark in Slovak or Czech language.

Zarbi 

The Zarbi appeared in the 1965 First Doctor story The Web Planet written by Bill Strutton, and are an ant-like insectoid species, with some characteristics associated with beetles, from the planet Vortis, which were controlled by the power of the Animus. They are roughly eight feet long, and the Menoptra claim that they are "little more than cattle".

They possess little intelligence but were not at all aggressive until the Animus arrived. They were enslaved to the alien consciousness and considered the butterfly-like Menoptra their mortal enemies. Only they could control the woodlouse-like venom grubs, also known as larvae guns.

They returned to their normal ways after the Animus was defeated by the First Doctor, Ian Chesterton, Barbara Wright and Vicki. It is presumed that the various species on Vortis are now living peacefully together.

A Zarbi and a Menoptra were shown on cover of the first edition of Doctor Who Annual in September 1965 along with two other Doctor Who alien races, a Voord and a Sensorite.

Zocci 

The Zocci are a diminutive race of red spiked aliens. Voyage of the Damned featured a Zocci named Bannakaffalatta. His species was first named in "The End of Time", where the Vinvocci are quick to differentiate themselves from the Zocci.

Zolfa-Thuran 
A race of intelligent cacti from the planet Zolfa-Thura.  Meglos, from the episode of the same name, was the last surviving member of the species.

Z’ros 
These aliens are referenced in Michael Feeney Callan's The Children of January in February 1986. The Z’ros are a race of proto-human like bees who are a non-merciful race and love wars.

Zygon

See also 
 List of Doctor Who villains
 List of Doctor Who henchmen
 List of Doctor Who robots

References

External links 
 The Bumper Book of Doctor Who Monsters, Villains & Alien Species
 Children of the Earth BBC Torchwood site

Monsters and aliens
Doctor Who
Doctor Who monsters
 
Doctor Who lists
Monsters and aliens